Iberia is a census-designated place in western Washington Township, Morrow County, Ohio, United States. The community is served by the Northmor Local School District which formerly operated Iberia Elementary School in the community.  Iberia is near to Galion, and Martel. The ZIP code assigned to Iberia by the United States Postal Service is 43325.  The current population of Iberia is less than 200 as of the 2000 census. Iberia is northwest of Mount Gilead, the county seat.

Geography 
Iberia is located in Central Ohio at 40°67'034" North, 82°84'357" West (40.67034, -82.84357), at the junction of State Route 309 and Morrow County Road 30.

History
Iberia was founded in 1827 and plated in 1832 by Frederick Meyers and Samuel Foster.  The community most likely was named after the Iberian Peninsula. On modern maps, the town is located at the junction of State Route 309 and Morrow County Road 30.

Iberia was once the home of Iberia College, later Ohio Central College, a Presbyterian Church affiliated institution of higher learning. The college is most closely aligned with its most notable graduate, Warren G. Harding, the 29th President of the United States.  Following the cessation of classes, the records and alumni of Ohio Central College were assumed by Muskingum College of New Concord, Ohio.

Another man affiliated with Iberia College was its first president, the Rev. George A. Gordon, an abolitionist and local Presbyterian minister who refused a presidential pardon granted by Abraham Lincoln.  The minister had been convicted for violating the Fugitive Slave Law.  He died in 1868 and was buried in Iberia Cemetery.  His actions were but a part of the operations of the Underground Railroad, along which Iberia was a significant host to several "stations".

Iberia is also listed as the home of Cleveland Blues professional baseball player John "Harry" McNeal.  According to Baseball-Almanac McNeal played for a high school called Iberia High School and later attended Oberlin University.  He started ten of his 12 professional appearances for Cleveland, went 5-5 overall with nine complete games.  

Iberia's greatest period of growth occurred at turn of the 20th Century when the community served as a farm community center.   For a short period in the 1920s, the town was located along the "Marion" spur of the Lincoln Highway.

References
Miller, Larry L. Ohio Place Names. Indiana University Press, 1996. 

Census-designated places in Morrow County, Ohio
Populated places on the Underground Railroad
Populated places established in 1827
1827 establishments in Ohio